Teretonga (means "Swift South" in Maori) is a  motor racing circuit situated  south-west of Invercargill, New Zealand. It is home of the Southland Sports Car Club. The circuit was established in 1957 and is the southernmost FIA-recognised race track in the world (the Autódromo Carlos Romero in Tolhuin, Tierra del Fuego (Argentina) is further south but is not FIA recognised). It is also the country's oldest purpose-built venue.

Regular racing programme includes rounds of the local Clubmans Series; featuring rounds of South Island Racing Registers and a very large Classic Car meeting in February of each year. The circuit is also used for Sprints and Motorkhanas. Other clubs run Motor Cycle and Drag Races at Teretonga. Regarded by many drivers as the best and safest track in the country, it has been up-graded on a continual basis.

History 

 Since 1948 the Southland Sports Car Club Inc. has been one of the leading Clubs in the country. The Club entered the International motor race series in 1956 with the fastest-ever motor race on a road circuit at Ryal Bush. This led to the construction of Teretonga Park in 1957 at Sandy Point, the second purpose-built motor racing track in New Zealand. It was extended to its present configuration in December 1966.
 In the golden age of NZ Motor Racing in the '60s and '70s, Teretonga hosted many of the world's greatest drivers for example, (Stirling Moss), Jim Clark, Graham Hill, Jackie Stewart, Jack Brabham, Bruce McLaren, Denny Hulme, Chris Amon, Phil Hill, the list goes on. There is a fine display of memorabilia in the Clubrooms.
 Since 1981 the club has been actively engaged in the New Zealand Rally Championship.
 The New Zealand Grand Prix was first held on Teretonga in 13 January 2002. A record number of entries were received for this event, and it had been held at Teretonga for 6 years until 13 January 2007.
 On 16 February to Sunday 17 February 2008, the "Leitch Motorsport/Southland Times Speed Fest", which was one of the events of Southern Festival of Speed, was held at Teretonga.

The circuit 

It flows smoothly from turns 1 through to 5. The circuit is exposed to a strong sea breeze and often forces gearbox and setup changes.

Lap Records 

The official lap record for the Teretonga Park is 0:51.206, set by Greg Murphy in 29 November 1998. The official race lap records at the Teretonga Park are listed as:

Notes

References

External links 

 Official Site
 NZV8s' Teretonga Park info
 Teretonga Park in Google Maps

Motorsport venues in New Zealand
Sports venues in Invercargill
Drag racing venues in Australasia
New Zealand Grand Prix